Matthew Watson is a professor of political economy and international political economy (IPE) in University of Warwick's Department of Politics and International Studies. His work in the area of IPE has been published widely; he has solely authored three books, and had around thirty articles published in peer reviewed academic journals on a wide range of issues in political economy and IPE. His three books are Foundations of International Political Economy (Palgrave Macmillan, 2005) (which received a nomination for the IPEG Book of the Year Award 2004/2005), Political Economy of International Capital Mobility (Palgrave Macmillan, 2007), and Uneconomic Economics and the Crisis of the Model World (Palgrave Macmillan, 2014). Between 2001 and 2007, Watson served as a member of the Steering Committee of the Standing Conference of Arts and Social Sciences.

Watson has also been an organiser of two of the Political Studies Association's specialist groups: the Labour Movements Specialist Group and the Political Economy Specialist Group. Additionally, he has acted as advisor to both Oxfam (on its fair trade campaign) and War on Want (on its Tobin tax and duty on foreign exchange transactions campaigns in the UK), and he has occasionally been consulted by Bloomberg.com as an expert on the UK's economic policy.

Selected publications
The Market (Agenda Publishing, 2018).
Uneconomic Economics and the Crisis of the Model World (Palgrave Macmillan, 2014).
Political Economy of International Capital Mobility (Palgrave Macmillan, 2007).

Foundations of International Political Economy, Basingstoke: Palgrave Macmillan, 2005.
 (3rd place in the 2006 Templeton Enterprise Article)

References

External links
Warwick University: Matthew Watson's Biography
Matthew Watson's book on his view of IPE

British political scientists
Academics of the University of Warwick
Year of birth missing (living people)
Living people